Piran Dam is a stone and concrete hydroelectric dam on the Piran stream located about  east of Piran in Sarpol-e Zahab County, Kermanshah Province, Iran. The project started in 1989 when preliminary studies started. All studies were carried out by 2000. The main contractor was selected in 2007.  Construction of the dam started in 2008 and the dam was inaugurated on 24 November 2011.  It cost more than US$15 million.

The projects includes a  transfer channel,  of siphon pipes, and  outlet channel.

The power plant has installed capacity of 8.4 MW. It has two Pelton turbines manufactured by Ghet Hydro Energy and two generators manufactured by WEG.

See also

List of power stations in Iran

References

Hydroelectric power stations in Iran